Richard Gray (March 14, 1920 – January 3, 1990) was a Canadian ice hockey player with the Lethbridge Maple Leafs. He won a gold medal at the 1951 World Ice Hockey Championships in Paris, France. The 1951 Lethbridge Maple Leafs team was inducted to the Alberta Sports Hall of Fame in 1974.

References

1920 births
1990 deaths
Canada men's national ice hockey team coaches
Canadian ice hockey defencemen
Ice hockey people from Calgary